The COOL Awards is an annual children's choice award voted on by students in Canberra, the Australian Capital Territory, Australia.  Children are encouraged to read and vote for their favourite books.  The votes are tallied and the awards made.

The COOL Award name is an acronym, standing for Canberra’s Own Outstanding List.

The ACT Public Library currently convenes the awards and they are administered by a committee representing ACT Government, Catholic and Independent Schools, the ACT Public Library and the Children's Book Council of Australia, ACT Branch. The award was first made in 1991.

Award categories and descriptions

There are four categories of the COOL awards:
 for most popular Picture Book
 for most popular Fiction for Younger Readers
 for most popular Fiction for Older Readers
 for most popular Fiction for Years 7-9 (commenced in 2007)

List of COOL Award winners

Picture Book Award

Fiction for Younger Readers Award

Fiction for Older Readers Award

Fiction for Years 7-9 Award

See also

 List of Australian literary awards
 List of CBCA Awards

Notes

References
 COOL Awards Shortlist 2007 (Retrieved 10 August 2007)
 Cool Awards - Children's Choice Book Awards in Canberra (Retrieved 10 August 2007)
 CBCA Awards (Retrieved 10 August 2007)

Children's Book Council of Australia
Australian children's literary awards